The 22nd Cannes Film Festival was held from 8 to 23 May 1969.  At this festival a new non-competitive section called Directors' Fortnight was added, in response to the cancellation of the 1968 festival.

The Grand Prix du Festival International du Film went to If.... by Lindsay Anderson. The festival opened with Sweet Charity, directed by Bob Fosse.

Jury
The following people were appointed as the Jury of the 1969 film competition:

Feature films
Luchino Visconti (Italy) (president)
Chinghiz Aitmatov (Soviet Union)
Marie Bell (France)
Jaroslav Boček (Czechoslovakia)
Veljko Bulajić (Yugoslavia)
Stanley Donen (USA)
Jerzy Glucksman (Sweden) (student)
Robert Kanters (France) (critic)
Sam Spiegel (USA)
Short films
Charles Duvanel (Switzerland)
Mihnea Gheorghiu (Romania)
Claude Soulé (France) (CST official)

Official selection

In competition - Feature film
The following feature films competed for the Grand Prix du Festival International du Film:

Ådalen 31 by Bo Widerberg
All My Compatriots by Vojtěch Jasný
The Appointment by Sidney Lumet
Calcutta by Louis Malle
Dillinger Is Dead by Marco Ferreri
Don't Let the Angels Fall by George Kaczender
Antonio das Mortes by Glauber Rocha
Easy Rider by Dennis Hopper
End of a Priest by Evald Schorm
Flashback by Raffaele Andreassi
The Great Love by Pierre Étaix
Hunting Flies by Andrzej Wajda
Hymn to a Tired Man by Masaki Kobayashi
If.... by Lindsay Anderson
Isadora by Karel Reisz
It Rains in My Village by Aleksandar Petrović
Machine Gun McCain by Giuliano Montaldo
Man on Horseback by Volker Schlöndorff
The Man Who Thought Life by Jens Ravn
Matzor by Gilberto Tofano
Metti una sera a cena by Giuseppe Patroni Griffi
My Night at Maud's by Éric Rohmer
The Prime of Miss Jean Brodie by Ronald Neame
Slaves by Herbert Biberman
Spain Again by Jaime Camino
Z by Costa Gavras

Films out of competition
The following films were selected to be screened out of competition:

 Andrei Rublev by Andrei Tarkovsky
 Arthur Rubinstein - The Love of Life (L'amour de la vie) by François Reichenbach
 The Deserter and the Nomads (Zbehovia a pútnici) by Juraj Jakubisko
 Frozen Flashes (Et L'Angleterre Sera Détruite) by János Veiczi
 Sweet Charity by Bob Fosse
 That Cold Day in the Park by Robert Altman

Short film competition
The following short films competed for the Grand Prix International du Festival:

Le Ballet des Jacungos by Jean Manzon
Cîntecele Renasterii by Mirel Ilieşiu
Goldframe by Raoul Servais
L'Homme aux chats by Henri Glaeser
Moc osudu by Jiří Brdečka
Niebieska kula by Mirosław Kijowicz
La Pince à ongles by Jean-Claude Carrière
Red Arrows by John Edwards
Short Seven by Jonne Severijn
Su sambene non est aba by Luigi Gonzo & Manfredo Manfredi
Toccata by Herman van der Horst
El Triunfo de la muerte by José María Gutiérrez
Das Verräterische Herz by Paul Anczykowski
World of Man by Albert Fischer & Michael Collyer

Parallel sections

International Critics' Week
The following feature films were screened for the 8th International Critics' Week (8e Semaine de la Critique):

 Cabascabo by Oumarou Ganda (Niger)
 Charles mort ou vif by Alain Tanner (Switzerland)
 Sziget a szárazföldön by Judit Elek (Hungary)
 The Hour of the Furnaces (La Hora de los hornos) by Fernando Solanas (Argentina)
 King, Murray by David Hoffman (United States)
 More by Barbet Schroeder (Luxembourg)
 My Girlfriend’s Wedding by Jim McBride (United States)
 Pagine chiuse by Gianni da Campo (Italy)
 La Rosière de Pessac by Jean Eustache (France)
 La Voie by Mohamed Slimane Riad (Algeria)
 In the Year of the Pig by Emile de Antonio (United States)
 Hunting Scenes from Bavaria (Jagdszenen aus Niederbayern) by Peter Fleischmann (West Germany)
 Paris n’existe pas by Robert Benayoun (France)

Directors' Fortnight
The following films were screened for the 1969 Directors' Fortnight (Quinzaine des Réalizateurs):

 Acéphale by Patrick Deval (France)
 Adam 2 by Jan Lenica (West Germany)
 Ballade pour un chien by René Allio, Gérard Vergez (France)
 Barravento by Glauber Rocha (Brazil)
 Between Salt and Sweet Water (Entre la mer et l'eau douce) by Michel Brault (Canada)
 Brandy in the Wilderness by Stanton Kaye (United States)
 O Bravo Guerreiro by Gustavo Dahl (Brazil)
 Brazil Year 2000 (Brasil Ano 2000) by Walter Lima Jr (Brazil)
 Calcutta (doc.) by Louis Malle (France)
 Capitu by Paulo César Saraceni (Brazil)
 Capricci by Carmelo Bene (Italy)
 Christopher's Movie Matinée by Mort Ransen (Canada)
 Le Cinématographe by Michel Baulez (France)
 De mère en fille (doc.) by Anne-Claire Poirier (Canada)
 Death by Hanging (Kōshikei) by Nagisa Oshima (Japan)
 Diary of a Shinjuku Thief (Shinjuku Dorobō Nikki) by Nagisa Oshima (Japan)
 Drôle de jeu by Pierre Kast (France)
 Duett för kannibaler by Susan Sontag (Sweden)
 Eine Ehe by Hans Rolf Strobel, Heinrich Tichawsky (West Germany)
 The Ernie Game by Don Owen (Canada)
 L'été by Marcel Hanoun (France)
 Face To Face (Cara a cara) by Júlio Bressane (Brazil)
 La primera carga al machete by Manuel Octavio Gomez (Cuba)
 Five Girls Around the Neck (Pět holek na krku) by Evald Schorm (Czechoslovakia)
 Fuoco! by Gian Vittorio Baldi (Italy)
 A Gentle Woman (Une femme douce) by Robert Bresson (France)
 Les Gommes by Francis Deroisy (Belgium)
 Head by Bob Rafelson (United States)
 Het compromis by Philo Bregstein (Netherlands)
 The Illiac Passion by Gregory Markopoulos (France)
 Image, Flesh and Voice by Ed Emshwiller (United States)
 Invasión by Hugo Santiago (Argentina)
 Jardim de guerra by Neville dAlmeida (Brazil)
 Le Joujou Chéri by Gabriel Axel (Denmark)
 Kid Sentiment by Jacques Godbout (Canada)
 Le lit de la Vierge by Philippe Garrel (France)
 Lucía by Humberto Solas (Cuba)
 Mai 68, la belle ouvrage (doc.) by Jean-Luc Magneron (France)
 Marie by Marta Meszaros (Hungary)
 Marketa Lazarová by František Vláčil (Czechoslovakia)
 Money, Money by José Varela (France)
 The Most Beautiful Age by Jaroslav Papoušek (Czechoslovakia)
 Mumbo-Jumbo by Jean-Luc Magneron (France)
 Nocturne 29 by Pere Portabella (Spain)
 Nous n’irons plus au bois by Georges Dumoulin (France)
 Our Lady of the Turks (Nostra Signora dei Turchi) by Carmelo Bene (Italy)
 Partner by Bernardo Bertolucci (Italy)
 Paul by Diourka Medveczky (France)
 Paulina Is Leaving (Paulina s’en va) by André Téchiné (France)
 La Poupée Rouge by Francis Leroi (France)
 The Rape of a Sweet Young Girl (Le viol d'une jeune fille douce) by Gilles Carle (Canada)
 Rhodesia Countdown by Michael Raeburn (Southern Rhodesia)
 Scratch Harry by Alex Matter (United States)
 Sirocco (Sirokkó) by Miklos Jancso (Hungary)
 The Smugglers (Les contrebandières) by Luc Moullet (France)
 Soliloquy by Stephen Dwoskin (United Kingdom)
 Straight to the Heart (Jusqu'au cœur) by Jean Pierre Lefebvre (Canada)
 Terry Withmore For an Example by Bill Brodie (Sweden)
 Three by James Salter (United States)
 A Time of Roses (Ruusujen aika) by Risto Jarva (Finland)
 The Trip by Roger Corman (United States)
 Tu imagines Robinson by Jean-Daniel Pollet (France)
 Vie provisoire by Mauricio Gomez Leite (Brazil)
 Les vieilles lunes by David Fahri (Switzerland)
 Vive la mort by Francis Reusser (Switzerland)
 Le Voyage by Fernando Cony Campos (Brazil)
 Wheel of Ashes by Peter Goldman (United States)
 Yvon, Yvonne by Claude Champion (Switzerland)

Short films

 5/7/35 by Jean Mazeas (France)
 Adrien s’éloigne by Claude Guillemot (France)
 Arrabal by Jacques Poitrenaud (France)
 Athènes, ville sourire by Lambros Liaropoulos (Greece)
 Black Movie by Adrian (filmmaker) (France)
 Chinese Chekers by Stephen Dwoskin (United Kingdom)
 Einer Mädchenhaut by Klaus Schönherr (France)
 Erin Ereinté by Jean-Paul Aubert (France)
 Flash-Parc by Frank Cassenti (France)
 Fuses by Carolee Schneemann (United States)
 Galaxie by Gregory Markopoulos (France)
 Gedanken beim Befühlen by Klaus Schönherr (France)
 Hemingway by Fausto Canel (Cuba)
 Jeanne et la moto by Diourka Medveczky (France)
 Journal de séjour a Marseille by C. Lindenmeyer, Gérard Levy-Clerc (France)
 La page dévoilée by Jim Hodgetts et Mike Marshall (France)
 La poursuite impitoyable by J.J. Schakmundes, R. Guillon (France)
 Le mariage de Clovis by Daniel Duval (France)
 Le Sursitaire by Serge Huet (France)
 Les Stabiles by Christian Lara (France)
 Libi by Otto Muehl (France)
 Marie et le Curé by Diourka Medveczky (France)
 Miss Paris et le Majordome by Georges Dumoulin (France)
 Monsieur Jean-Claude Vaucherin by Pascal Aubier (France)
 N.O.T.H.I.N.G. by Paul Sharits (France)
 Naissant by Stephen Dwoskin (United Kingdom)
 On the Every Day of the Eyes of Death by Robert Beavers (France)
 Paris des Négritudes by Jean Schmidt (France)
 Permanence by Busioc Ionesco (Romania)
 Que s’est-il passé en Mai? by Jean-Pierre Savignac (France)
 Rohfilm by G. Hein (France)
 S. Macht am Sonntag-Nachmittag keinen Film by Dieter Meier (France)
 Scenes from Under Childhood by Stan Brakhage (France)
 Souvenir de la nuit du 4 by Patrice Gauthier, Henry Lange (France)
 Speak by John Latham (United Kingdom)
 The Mysteries by Gregory Markopoulos (France)
 Twice A Man by Gregory Markopoulos (France)
 Untebrochene Flugverbindungen by Dieter Meier (France)
 Versucht mit Synth. Ton by Kurt Kren (France)
 Winged Dialogue by Robert Beavers (France)

Awards

Official awards
The following films and people received the 1969 Official selection awards:
Grand Prix du Festival International du Film: If.... by Lindsay Anderson
Grand Prix Spécial du Jury: Ådalen 31 by Bo Widerberg
Best Director:
Glauber Rocha for Antonio das Mortes
Vojtěch Jasný for All My Compatriots (Všichni dobří rodáci)
Best Actress: Vanessa Redgrave for Isadora
Best Actor: Jean-Louis Trintignant for Z
Jury Prize: Z by Costa Gavras (Unanimously)
Best First Work: Easy Rider by Dennis Hopper
Short films
Grand Prix International du Festival: Cîntecele Renasterii by Mirel Ilieşiu
Prix spécial du Jury: La Pince à ongles by Jean-Claude Carrière

Independent awards
FIPRESCI
FIPRESCI Prize: Andrei Rublev by Andrei Tarkovsky
Commission Supérieure Technique
Technical Grand Prize - Special Mention: All My Compatriots (Všichni dobří rodáci) by Vojtěch Jasný
Short film - Special Mention: Cîntecele Renasterii by Mirel Ilieşiu & Toccata by Herman van der Horst

References

Media
INA: Opening of the 1969 Festival (commentary in French)
INA: Closing ceremony Cannes 1969 (commentary in French)

External links 
1969 Cannes Film Festival (web.archive)
Official website Retrospective 1969 
Cannes Film Festival Awards for 1969 at Internet Movie Database

Cannes Film Festival, 1969
Cannes Film Festival, 1969
Cannes Film Festival